Watever is a French NGO composed of professionals from the maritime industry, transport and development which was created in 2010 by Marc Van Peteghem, Yves Marre, Alain Connan and Gérald Similowski, convinced that boats can be a gateway to development.
Watever assists underprivileged populations living on the shores of oceans and rivers. The NGO is looking to provide access to innovative and sustainable floating solutions, adapted to their economic, social and climatic situation.
The concepts that are developed are designed to improve their life conditions by combining modern techniques and traditional knowledge.

History 

The NGO arises from the encounter of its two founding members in 2004: Marc Van Peteghem (President) and Yves Marre (Vice-President).

A friendship was born between these two men who share the same values and results in several projects.

Together they developed the concept of floating ambulance in Bangladesh, for the floating hospitals of Friendship, and produced the first unsinkable boats for the fishermen of the country.
In 2010, they created NGO Watever with Alain Connan and Gérald Similowski to support the development of shipbuilding industry in Bangladesh, working on innovation and transfer of technologies.

Bangladesh is considered as the pilot country where NGO Watever can study and finalize various solutions that could be replicated in countries with similar issues.

Field of activities 

Watever develops floating solutions to support people living on the shores of oceans and large rivers.
Its main aims are:
 Research and development
 Support to local shipbuilding through Taratari shipyard, their local partner in Bangladesh
 The implementation of a training program for the manufacture and maintenance of boats made of composite materials

The NGO also supports other maritime projects in Bangladesh such as:
 The preservation and the enhancement of the local naval heritage
 The creation of the M.S.R.S, the "Maritime Security & Rescue Society", a sea rescue company in Bangladesh

Projects 

 2005: Launch of the first two ambulances catamaran of Bangladesh
 2007: Design and production of the prototype of the first unsinkable fishing boat of Bangladesh
 2010: Creation of NGO Watever
 2010: Launch of the first unsinkable fishing boat of Bangladesh
 2010: Corentin de Chatelperron, volunteer sent by NGO Watever to Taratari shipyard, sails from Bangladesh to France on a 40% Jute made sailing boat. Birth of « Gold of Bengal » project, which will be supported for three years by NGO Watever.
 2011: Renovation and increase of the medicalized area of the French barge "Lifebuoy Friendship Hospital", first floating hospital of Friendship (NGO)
 2012: Taratari shipyard delivers 7 shuttle-boats for the children of Rangamati lake ordered by Unicef
 2012: Taratari shipyard delivers 60 unsinkable fishing boats for Food and Agriculture Organization
 2013: Excavation of the "Golden Boat" from Kuakata (southwestern Bangladesh), a wreck that was buried for over one hundred years
 2013: First training of the country of 15 technicians in the maintenance and repair of fishing vessels
 2013: Launch of "Gold of Bengal" prototype, a sailing boat made of 100% Jute and Polyester resin.
 2013: Construction and preservation of the "Moon Boat" of Cox’s Bazar
 2014: Beginning of the production of 10 new shuttle-boats for children of Rangamati Lake

Projects in development 

 2014: Launching of Watever Training Center for composite shipbuilding
 2014: Launching of a research project on bio-composite made from bamboo
 2014: Launching of the Maritime Security and Rescue Society in Bangladesh

Partners 

 A.K Khan & Company Ltd.
 Alliance française
 Crucell
 Food and Agriculture Organization
 Friendship (NGO)
 Kaïros
 Outremer Yachting
 Taratari shipyard
 Unicef
 Van Peteghem Lauriot-Prévost VPLP
 Veolia Environnement
 Zeppelin-Geo

References

External links 
 
 VPLP's website

Sailing
Transport organizations based in France
Foreign charities operating in Bangladesh
Transport organisations based in Bangladesh